The Darwin Dam is an offstream earthfill embankment saddle dam without a spillway, located in Western Tasmania, Australia. The impounded reservoir, also formed by Crotty Dam, is called Lake Burbury.

The dam was constructed in 1990 by the Hydro Electric Corporation (TAS) for the purpose of generating hydro-electric power via the John Butters Power Station.  It had been known during construction as the Andrew Divide Dam.

Features and location
The Darwin Dam, together with the Crotty Dam, are two major dams that form the headwaters for the King River Hydroelectric Power Development. The dam is located at the southern end of Lake Burbury, and holds the water for the lake.

At 100% capacity the dam wall holds back  of water. The dam wall does not have a spillway.

The dam draws its name from Mount Darwin, a peak located to the west of the dam wall. Both locations draw their names from the railway stopping place and the ghost town site of Darwin that was situated on the North Mount Lyell Railway between Gormanston and Kelly Basin.  It inundates the former Kelly Basin Road which was the subsequent name for the railway line formation.

In the 1910s the Mount Lyell Mining and Railway Company had investigated and surveyed a site very close to this dam for a proposed scheme.

See also

List of dams in Tasmania

References

Further reading
 
 

West Coast Range
Hydro Tasmania dams
Embankment dams
Infrastructure completed in 1990
Infrastructure in Tasmania
King River power development scheme